Jean-François "J-F" Bérubé (born July 13, 1991) is a Canadian professional ice hockey goaltender who is currently playing with the Charlotte Checkers in the American Hockey League (AHL). He was selected by the Los Angeles Kings in the fourth round (95th pick overall) of the 2009 NHL Entry Draft.

Playing career

Amateur
As a youth, Bérubé played in the 2004 Quebec International Pee-Wee Hockey Tournament with a minor ice hockey team from the Mille-Îles area of Laval, Quebec.

Prior to turning professional, Bérubé played major junior hockey in the Quebec Major Junior Hockey League with the Montreal Junior Hockey Club.

Professional

On May 24, 2011, the Los Angeles Kings signed Bérubé to a three-year, entry-level contract. He played for the Kings' AHL affiliate, the Manchester Monarchs, as their starting goaltender. On October 6, 2015, he was waived by the Kings due to Jhonas Enroth being chosen as the Kings' back-up for the season.

On October 6, 2015, the New York Islanders claimed Bérubé off waivers. On October 10, 2015, Bérubé made his NHL debut against the Chicago Blackhawks, stopping 30 of 34 shots as the Islanders lost 4–1.

Bérubé opened the 2016–17 season with the Islanders, behind Jaroslav Halák and Thomas Greiss; the Islanders waived Halák in December 2016, making Bérubé the Islanders full-time backup. After only posting only 3 wins in 14 games, Halak was later recalled.

As an impending group VI free agent after his two-year stint with the Islanders, Bérubé was selected by the Vegas Golden Knights in the 2017 NHL Expansion Draft on June 21, 2017. His selection was based upon a trade between the clubs' in which the Islanders sent a first-round pick in 2017, second-round pick in 2019, prospect Jake Bischoff and the contract of long term injured player, Mikhail Grabovski.

On July 1, Bérubé signed a two-year free agent contract with the Chicago Blackhawks, worth a total of $1.5 million. Bérubé started the season in the American Hockey League with the Rockford Ice Hogs, where he posted a 7–8 record with a 2.37 GAA. He was recalled to Chicago on February 15, 2018, and made his debut on February 23 in a 3−1 win over the San Jose Sharks. Bérubé finished the season with 3–6–1 record in 10 starts for the Blackhawks, with a 3.78 GAA and .894 save percentage.

On June 27, 2018, Bérubé was traded by the Blackhawks to the Columbus Blue Jackets in exchange for Jordan Schroeder.

On July 1, 2019, Bérubé left the Blue Jackets as a free agent to sign a one-year, two-way contract with the Philadelphia Flyers. After attending the Flyers training camp, Bérubé was assigned to AHL affiliate, the Lehigh Valley Phantoms for the 2019–20 season. He appeared in 29 games with the Phantoms, posting a 12–11–4 record, along with three shutouts. With the Flyers opting to increase the roles of their younger prospects, Bérubé was traded to the New York Rangers to join their AHL affiliate, the Hartford Wolf Pack, in exchange for future considerations on February 19, 2020.

On December 31, 2020, Bérubé signed a one-year contract with the Ontario Reign of the AHL.

As a free agent over the following summer, Bérubé was invited to attend the Columbus Blue Jackets training camp in preparation for the  season. On October 1, 2021, after making an impression through camp, Bérubé was signed to a one-year, two-way contract with the Blue Jackets. With the Blue Jackets hampered by injuries to their goaltenders, Bérubé added to his NHL experience in appearing in 6 games and collecting 3 wins.

Leaving the Blue Jacket at the conclusion of his contract, Bérubé was familiarly invited on a professional tryout contract to attend the Florida Panthers 2022 training camp. He was later assigned and signed a PTO with AHL affiliate, the Charlotte Checkers, to begin the 2022–23 season.

Career statistics

Awards and honours

References

External links

 

1991 births
Living people
Bridgeport Sound Tigers players
Canadian ice hockey goaltenders
Charlotte Checkers (2010–) players
Chicago Blackhawks players
Cleveland Monsters players
Columbus Blue Jackets players
French Quebecers
Ice hockey people from Quebec
Hartford Wolf Pack players
Lehigh Valley Phantoms players
Los Angeles Kings draft picks
Manchester Monarchs (AHL) players
Montreal Junior Hockey Club players
New York Islanders players
Ontario Reign (AHL) players
Ontario Reign (ECHL) players
People from Repentigny, Quebec
Rockford IceHogs (AHL) players